Diminutive forms of words are commonly used in everyday Australian English. While many dialects of English make use of diminutives and hypocorisms, Australian English uses them more extensively than any other. Diminutives may be seen as slang, but many are used widely across the whole of society. Some forms have also spread outside Australia to other English-speaking countries. There are over 5,000 identified diminutives in use in Australian English.

Usage

In other English dialects, diminutives usually imply smallness or have a childish connotation such as in 'birdie', 'doggy', or 'kitty'. While diminutives can be used in this way in Australian English, they are also used widely in a non-childish manner, with over 4,300 being recorded. For example, bikie (a motorcycle, or motorbike club member), does not imply a bicycle in a small or childish sense as it may in other English dialects.

In Australian English, diminutives are usually formed by taking the first part of a word, and adding an ending such as a, o, ie, or y. Sometimes, no ending is added. While the form of a diminutive is arbitrary, their use follows strict rules. Diminutives are not used creatively. For example, an ambulance paramedic is called an ambo, never ambie, or amba. 
Some diminutives are almost always used in preference to the original form, while others are rarely used or restricted to certain groups or locations. The use of diminutives also evolves over time, with new words coming into use and others falling out of favour. Some diminutives have become so common that the original form has fallen out of common usage. For example, Salvos has begun to replace the name Salvation Army to such an extent that some Australians do not recognise the Salvation Army name. Deli has become so universal that delicatessen is rarely used. Some words, such as ute, from utility vehicle, a car with a tray back, have become universal.

There is common usage of the diminutive forms of people's names; Hargrave → Hargie; Sharon → Shazza; Clark→ Clarky; Wilkinson → Wilko; John → Jonno; David → Davo; Hogan → Hoges; James → Jimmy → Jim → Jimbo; Benjamin → Ben → Benno; Barry → Bazza. This is usually a display of affection and acceptance rather than belittlement.

Organizations and businesses will often embrace the diminutives given to them by Australians, using them in their own advertising and even registering it as a trademark. McDonald's Australia, for example, has registered and uses the name Macca's, rather than the term McDonald's still seen on its restaurants in Australia.

Some diminutives are rarely used, but widely recognised. For example, chalkie means teacher, but most Australians simply call a teacher a teacher.

Diminutives are often used for place names, and are only recognised by people in the local area, for example, cot for Cottesloe Beach in Perth, Parra for Parramatta in Sydney and Broady for Broadmeadows in Melbourne. Pub and hotel names in particular are often shortened. For example, pubs called the Esplanade Hotel, such as the Esplanade Hotel in St. Kilda, will often be called The Espy.

Purpose and history
The purpose of diminutives in Australian English is not well understood despite being a prominent part of Australian culture. Some research suggests that the use of diminutives serves to make interactions more informal, friendly and relaxed. Linguist Anna Wierzbicka argues that Australians' use of diminutives reflects Australian cultural values of mateship, friendliness, informality, and solidarity, while downplaying formality and avoiding bragging associated with tall poppy syndrome.

Records of the use of diminutives in Australian English date back to the 1800s. Older Australians tend to prefer diminutives with endings such a '-o' in smoko (a work rest break); however, younger Australians have begun to use endings such as -s as seen in totes (totally).

List of diminutives
This list contains noteworthy and commonly understood diminutives from Australian English.

Those marked ‡ are also common in other English dialects.

A

Abo or (more commonly) Abbo, an indigenous Australian. From Aboriginal. Considered offensive.
Acca/Dacca, AC/DC, popular band
Aggro, aggressive, aggravated or angry
Ag pipe, agricultural pipe (black heavy-duty hose used for irrigation etc.)
Albo, Anthony Albanese, 31st prime minister of Australia
Alco or (less commonly) ‡Alkie,  an alcoholic
Ambo, an ambulance paramedic
Arvo or (less commonly) Arvie, afternoon
Avo, avocado
‡Aussie, Australian

Back to top

B

Barbie, a barbecue, the cooking apparatus itself or the event of cooking food on a barbecue
Barra, a barramundi, or the Ford Barra engine built by Ford Australia
‡Beauty, Beaut, or Bewdy, beautiful. Used in a much wider sense than the beauty, e.g. fantastic or excellent.
‡Bickie, Biccy or bikkie, a biscuit
Bidgie, the Murrumbidgee River
Bikie, a member of a motorcycle club, with a connotation of involvement in criminal activity. This is equivalent to biker in other forms of English. A motorcycle club is called a bikie club. Outlaw motorcycle clubs may also be called bikie gangs.
Blowie, a blowfly. A large buzzing fly common in Australia.
Blowy, fellatio, short for blow job.
‡Bolshie, from Bolshevik, meaning of a person or attitude, deliberately combative or uncooperative.
‡Bookie, a bookmaker
Boardies, boardshorts, worn by surfers
Bottle-oh, (historical) a mobile bottle collector (for return and re-use)
Bottle-o, a bottle shop or alcohol store
Bowlo, a lawn bowls clubhouse
‡Brekkie or Brekky, breakfast
Brissy (alternate spellings Brizzy, Brissie or Brizzie), Brisbane, the capital of Queensland. Also BrisVegas is commonly used.
‡Brickie, a bricklayer
Broadie or Broady, Broadmeadows in Victoria, Broadbeach in Queensland
Brushie, a brushtail possum
Bub, baby, as in "mum and bub"
‡Budgie, a budgerigar, a parakeet. Male swimming briefs are called budgie smugglers.
Bundy, Bundaberg, Queensland, Bundaberg Rum
Bushie, one who is competent to live away from civilization (from bushman)

Back to top

C

Cabo, Caboolture, Queensland
Cab Sav, Cabernet Sauvignon wine
‡Cardie, a cardigan
Cauli (pron. "collie"), cauliflower
Ceno or Cenno, the Centrelink office. Also used to refer to a fortnightly payment (pension or otherwise) from the Centrelink office.
Chalkie, a teacher. From chalk used on blackboards. Once also applied to employees of the Australian Stock Exchange who wrote stock prices on chalk boards prior to computerisation.
Champers, champagne
Chardy, chardonnay wine
Chewy, chewing gum
‡Chippie, a carpenter. From wood chips
Chockers, full to overflowing, derived from "chock-a-block"
Chockie, chocolate
Chocko (from chocolate soldier), a member of the Australian Army Reserve
Chrissie or Chrissy, Christmas
Chuck a u-ey, do a u-turn (when driving a vehicle)
‡Ciggie, a cigarette
Cockie, a cockatoo. Commonly a sulphur-crested cockatoo. By extension, a farmer, e.g. "cow cockie" for dairy farmer. Also slang for cockroach
Coldie, a cold can or stubby of beer, as in "crack a coldie"
Connie, a bus or train conductor, a condom
Coota, Cootamundra, also barracouta
‡Compo, compensation for being injured at work. Generally not used for other forms of compensation.
 Corro, corrugated iron
‡Cossies or Cozzies, a bathing costume
Cow Bombie, Cowaramup Bombora
Cranie, a crane driver
Croc, a crocodile
Crownie, variously refers to Crown Lager or a Crown Prosecutor, the latter popularised by the televisions series Crownies.
‡Cuppa, a cup of tea or coffee

Back to top

D

Dandy, Dandenong
‡Deli, a delicatessen
Dero or derro, a derelict, a poor (often homeless) person, or location or building; also used as an adjective
Devo, devastated, very upset over some event
Deso, a designated driver
Doco, a documentary
Dodge, dodgy or suspicious
Doughie, the doughnut driving manoeuvre
‡Druggie, illicit drug user

Back to top

E
Eckies, ecstasy. From the street name for MDMA.
Ekka, exhibition. Used to describe the Brisbane Royal Show
Erko, the Sydney suburb of Erskineville
Esky, a portable insulated container. From the Eskimo brand, which was later shortened to esky.
Exy, expensive
Back to top

F

Falsies, a heavily-padded brassiere
Firie, a firefighter
Flannie, flannelette shirt
Flatties, flat-soled (women's) shoes
Flatty, a flat tyre, or a Flathead (fish)
‡Footy, football, which may refer to the sport of football, the ball itself, or a specific game. Generally, footy refers to Australian Rules Football in Southern and Western States or Rugby league in Queensland and New South Wales. Association football is either called football or soccer, but never footy. Rugby Union is called rugby, never footy. The Nine Network runs two longstanding variety television shows called The Footy Show; one for Aussie Rules, and the other for Rugby League.
Franga, Frankston, Victoria; a condom
Freo, Fremantle, Western Australia
Freshie, a freshwater crocodile, as opposed to a saltie - a saltwater crocodile. Also Freshwater Beach in Sydney
Forkie, a forklift operator

Back to top

G

The G, Melbourne Cricket Ground. An abbreviated version of the already short initialism used for the M.C.G.
G-town (or G-troit, which is a play on Detroit), referring to the Victorian city of Geelong
The Gabba, The Brisbane Cricket Ground. Located in the suburb Woolloongabba.
Garbo, a garbage collector
Gero, Geraldton.
Geo, to be of the Geologist profession.
Gladdy, the gladioli family of plants. The term was popularised by Barry Humphries in character as Dame Edna Everage
Glenny, short for Glen Waverley, a suburb in Victoria, Australia Glen Waverley.
The Gong, Wollongong, New South Wales
Greenie, an environmentalist, from the green movement; usually pejoratively
Goss, rumours, latest stories amongst friends gossip
Gossie,  Gosford

Back to top

H

‡Homo, homosexual (offensive)
Housos, (pron. –z–) residents of public housing
Hypo, hyperactive

Back to top

I

Indro, Indooroopilly, a suburb in Brisbane. 
Iso, isolation, gained popularity during the COVID-19 pandemic. Isopropyl alcohol 

Back to top

J

Jocks, men's briefs (underwear), esp. in phrase "socks and jocks"; from the brand name "Jockey"
‡Journo, a journalist
Jindy, short for Jindabyne

Back to top

K

Kanga, a kangaroo
Kero, kerosene
Kindy, Kinda or Kinder, kindergarten

Back to top

L

Lebo, or Leb, for Middle Eastern immigrant, specifically from Lebanon, sometimes pejorative. 
‡Leftie, a person with left wing views; a left-handed person
Lezzo, a lesbian (Offensive)
Liftie, a ski lift operator
‡Lippy, a lipstick
Lappy, a laptop computer

Back to top

M

Maccas, McDonald's fast food restaurants This is also reflected in McDonald's corporate branding.
Maggie, Australian magpie
Melbs, Melbourne
Metho or meths, methylated spirits; also Methodist
Middy or middie, a mid-sized beer (half-pint).
Mo, a moustache Contributed to the portmanteau "Movember".
‡Mong, an insult for someone implying that they are a mongoloid
‡Mozzie, mosquito
Murbah, Murwillumbah
Mushie, mushroom
Muso, a musician
Muzzies or muzzos, a term for Muslims, sometimes pejorative.

Back to top

N
Nasho, a conscript in the army. Derived from national service. Used especially around the Vietnam war. In the Army it was used in a derogatory sense. The term has fallen out of use as conscription in Australia ended in the 1970s. Common use is now Nationality
Newie or Newy, Newcastle
Back to top

P

Parra, Parramatta
Parma, Parmi or Parmy, chicken parmigiana, a pub food staple
Paro or Para, Paranoid. Also, extremely drunk (from paralytic).
Pav, pavlova
Physio, physiotherapy or physiotherapist
Pinky, a young, hairless brushtail possum that still resides in its marsupial mother's pouch, newborn rats and mice
Pokey, pokies, (mostly as plural), a poker machine
Pollie, a politician
Pommie (adjective or noun), English or English person (may be derogatory) also Pom (noun)
‡Postie, a postman or postwoman
Povvo or Pov, a poor or cheap person. From poverty
Preggo or ‡preggers, pregnant
‡Prezzies, gifts, presents; use widespread outside Australia
Probs, probably, also used for problem in the phrase "no probs"
‡Prozzies, prostitutes
Pushie, pushbike, a bicycle

Back to top

Q

Quazza, quarantine

Back to top

R

"R"ie, also rissole, RSL clubhouse
‡Ref, referee (noun), or to referee a game (verb)
Reffo, a pejorative term for a refugee
Rego, a vehicle registration
Reso, a reservation
Ressie or Ressy, the Melbourne suburb of Reservoir
Rellie or Relo, a relative
‡Rents, parents
Reo, reinforcing steel, rebar
Rocko, Rockingham
Rocky, Rockhampton
Rollie (from roll-your-own, pron. ROHL-ee), handmade cigarette
Roo, a kangaroo
Rotto, Rottnest Island

Back to top

S

Saltie, a saltwater crocodile, as opposed to a freshie, a freshwater crocodile
Salvos, Salvation Army. The term is used officially by the Salvation Army in Australia.
Sanga or Sanger, a sandwich. Originally sango, but evolved to its current from by the 1960s.
Sanny, hand sanitiser 
Sav, saveloy, especially battered sav, a showtime treat
Savvy B, Sauvignon Blanc wine
Scarn on, A shortened, colloquial term for 'what's going on' (a term used when greeting others)
ScoMo, Scott Morrison, 30th prime minister of Australia 
Selfie, a self-shot photograph. This term originated in Australia and has been adopted worldwide via the internet. It became The Oxford Dictionary's 2013 word of the year.
‡Semi, a semi-trailer truck, also a semi-final
‡Seppo, a pejorative term for an American. Seppo is a diminutive of septic tank which is in turn rhyming slang for yank, which is a diminutive of yankee.
Servo, a petrol station, service station
‡Shottie, a shotgun; also the act of riding in the front passenger seat of a vehicle, sometimes announced as "I call shotgun/shottie", to indicate that a person has claimed this seat. Can also refer to the carb hole in a bong.
‡Sickie, a sick day, often with a connotation of there being insufficient medical reason for missing work
Smoko, a smoking break while at work. Since smoking has been banned in many workplaces, a smoko has come to mean any rest break at work.
Snag, Sausage
‡Spag bol, Spaghetti Bolognese
‡Sparkie or Sparky, an electrician. From sparking, electric arcing
Spenny, expensive
Straya, short for Australia
Stubby or Stubbie, a small, wide bottle of beer
Subi or Subie, a Subaru car Also the suburb of Subiaco, in Perth
‡Sunnies, sunglasses
Super, superannuation. In Australia, all employers are obliged to set aside a percentage of a worker's wages in a superannuation fund.
Surfie, a surfer
Susso, from sustenance payments, a form of welfare during the Great Depression in the form of food coupons. The word has fallen out of use.
‡Suss, suspicious.
Swaggie, a swagman

Back to top

T

Taz or Tassie, Tasmania or Tasmanian
Techo, technician, technical (adjective)
‡Tellie or Telly, a television
‡Tinnie, historically referred to a beverage can (usually a beer can) but today generally refers to an aluminium flat-bottomed boat. From tin can
Toonie, Toongabbie, a historic suburb in Western Sydney 
Towie, tow truck or a tow truck driver
Townie, townsperson, as distinct from bushie, so not to be trusted
‡Trackies, track pants or a tracksuit. Track pants are also known as trackie dacks, dacks being a colloquial word for trousers.
Tradie, a tradesperson
Traino, A train station
Trannie or Tranny, offensive word for a transgender person; also outdated slang for radio, stemming from the word "transistor radio" 
Troppo, from "tropics" as in "gone troppo", unhinged mentally (orig. army slang)
Truckie, a truck driver
‡Turps, alcohol, from turpentine, a toxic solvent historically used to adulterate gin. Usually used to say a person is "on the turps" (drinking heavily).
‡TV, a television, a common word outside of Australian English
‡Typo, a typographic error

Back to top

U

 ,U'ie (you-eee) To turn 180 degrees when driving a vehicle, U-Turn. 
Ump or Umpie, an umpire at a sporting game See also Ref
‡Undies, underwear. This word is used widely outside Australian English.
‡Uni, university
Ute, an abbreviation of "utility"; a passenger vehicle with a cargo tray in the rear. Festivals that involve gatherings of utes are popular in rural areas and are called ute musters.

Back to top

V

‡Veggie or vegie, vegetables, generally not a vegetarian
Veggo, a vegetarian, never a vegetable
Vic, Victoria
Vinnies, Society of Saint Vincent de Paul. The term is used officially by the society in Australia. Commonly runs "op shops" (opportunity shops)

Back to top

W

Westie, resident of a western suburb (several capital cities)
Wharfie, a docks worker
Wheelie, several car and bike manoeuvres — wheelstand or wheelspin; meaning found from context
Winnies, Winfield (brand) cigarettes, esp. "Winnie blues", a low-tar variety
‡Wino, an alcoholic who subsists on cheap, probably fortified, wine
‡Woolies, Woolworths supermarkets
Woollies, especially Winter woollies, woollen garments

Back to top

See also
Apocope
Hypocorism#English
List of English apocopations

References

Australian English